Lambley Viaduct is a stone bridge across the River South Tyne at Lambley in Northumberland. Formerly a railway bridge, it remains open to pedestrians but one end of the viaduct has been fenced off.

History

Lambley viaduct crosses the River South Tyne as a series of elegant stone arches. The railway, which was opened in 1852 to haul coal and lead from the Alston mines, closed in 1976, and the viaduct was allowed to decay. In 1991 the British Rail Property Board agreed to repair the viaduct and hand it over to the North Pennine Heritage Trust which would maintain it in the future; however the Trust went into administration in 2011.

The viaduct was probably designed by George Barclay Bruce, a Victorian engineer who was involved in the Alston line before leaving for India to pioneer railway construction there.

One end of the viaduct has been fenced off, after the path was diverted in 2004 to pass further away from Lambley railway station, which is now a private house.

It is a Grade II* listed structure.

References

Bridges in Northumberland
Crossings of the River Tyne
Former railway bridges in the United Kingdom
Grade II* listed railway bridges and viaducts